Chase Buchanan and Blaž Rola were the defending champions, but both players chose not to participate.

Toshihide Matsui and Yasutaka Uchiyama won the title, defeating Bumpei Sato and Yang Tsung-hua in the final, 7–6(8–6), 6–2.

Seeds

Draw

References 
 Draw

Dunlop World Challenge - Men's Doubles
2014 MD
2014 ATP Challenger Tour